Tadeusz Waśko (9 December 1922 – 4 May 1980) was a Polish footballer. He played in seven matches for the Poland national football team in 1948.

References

External links
 

1922 births
1980 deaths
Polish footballers
Poland international footballers
Place of birth missing
Association footballers not categorized by position